TyShwan DeNane Edmondson (born September 20, 1989) is an American professional basketball player who last played for the Brampton A's of the National Basketball League of Canada (NBL). He was named NBL Canada Newcomer of the Year and earned All-NBLC honors in the 2014–15 season. At Austin Peay State University, he earned All-Ohio Valley Conference honors in 2011.

High school career 
As a senior in high school, Edmondson played prep basketball at University Heights Academy in Hopkinsville, Kentucky under head coach Randy McCoy. Edmondson averaged 18.4 points, 6.7 rebounds, 4.3 assists, and 2.7 steals per game, powering his team to a Kentucky High School Athletic Association (KHSAA) district and regional title. Among the guard's teammates was Scotty Hopson, who would go on to play college basketball at Tennessee. Edmondson also earned most valuable player honors at the Kentucky All "A" Tournament. UHA finished the season with a 30–5 record.

On April 30, 2008, Edmondson verbally committed to play for St. John's at the NCAA Division I level.

References

External links 
TyShwan Edmondson on USBasket.com
Austin Peay bio
St. John's Red Storm bio

1989 births
Living people
American expatriate basketball people in Canada
American men's basketball players
Austin Peay Governors men's basketball players
Basketball players from South Bend, Indiana
Basketball players from Kentucky
Brampton A's players
Guards (basketball)
Midland Chaps basketball players
Sportspeople from Hopkinsville, Kentucky
Springfield Armor players
St. John's Red Storm men's basketball players